

B
Joe Bernstein,
Ed Brawley,
Charles Brickley,
George Brickley

D
Harrie Dadmun,
Mark Devlin,
Dinger Doane,
Jim Dufft,
Joe DuSossoit,

G
Tom Gormley

H
Doc Haggerty

J
Jimmy Jemail

K
George Kane,
George Kerr

L
Frank Leavitt

M
Buck MacDonald,
Al Maginnes,
Dave Maginnes,
Paul Meyers

N
Johnny Nagle,
Jerry Noonan

O
Con O'Brien,
Ed O'Hearn

P
Al Pierotti,
Mike Purdy

S
Fred Sweetland

T
Ray Trowbridge

References

 

New York Brickley Giants players
New York B